Amalda bathamae is a species of small deepwater sea snail, a marine gastropod mollusc in the family Ancillariidae.

References
 Powell A W B, New Zealand Mollusca, William Collins Publishers Ltd, Auckland, New Zealand 1979 

bathamae
Gastropods of New Zealand
Gastropods described in 1956